Hichori Morimoto (Japanese: 森本 稀哲, Korean: 이희철, Hanja: 李稀哲, born January 31, 1981) is a Japanese professional baseballer of Korean descent for the Saitama Seibu Lions. For years, he was the backup for the most popular player in the league, Tsuyoshi Shinjo. After the 2006 season in which the Fighters won the Japan Series, Shinjo announced his retirement, in which Morimoto then took over Shinjo's center field spot, and also his number 1 (Morimoto had worn number 46 when Shinjo was playing). Morimoto has alopecia areata, an autoimmune disease that causes loss of body hair.

References 

 
Hichori Morimoto, JapaneseBallPlayers.com

1981 births
Hokkaido Nippon-Ham Fighters players
Japanese baseball players
Japanese people of Korean descent
Living people
Naturalized citizens of Japan
Nippon Professional Baseball outfielders
Nippon Ham Fighters players
People from Tokyo
Yokohama BayStars players
Yokohama DeNA BayStars players
Saitama Seibu Lions players
Japanese baseball coaches
Nippon Professional Baseball coaches